Frond is the third studio album by Australian psychedelic rock band Pond, released on September 6, 2010 through Hole In The Sky.

Track listing

References

2010 albums
Pond (Australian band) albums
Albums produced by Kevin Parker